Maid Happy is a 1933 British musical film directed by Mansfield Markham and starring Charlotte Ander, Johannes Riemann and Dennis Hoey.

It was made at Elstree Studios by British International Pictures but distributed independently. The German art director Walter Reimann designed the film's sets.

Cast
 Charlotte Ander as Lena
 Johannes Riemann as Fritz
 Dennis Hoey as Sir Rudolph Bartlett
 Marjorie Mars as Mary Loo
 Sybil Grove as Miss Warburton
 Gerhard Dammann as Schmidt
 Polly Luce as Madge
 Harold Saxon-Snell as  Bruckmann
 Marie Ault as Miss Woods

References

Bibliography
 Low, Rachael. Filmmaking in 1930s Britain. George Allen & Unwin, 1985.
 Wood, Linda. British Films, 1927-1939. British Film Institute, 1986.

External links

1933 films
British musical films
1933 musical films
Films shot at British International Pictures Studios
British black-and-white films
1930s English-language films
1930s British films